The County Home Cemetery is a historic cemetery in Heritage Park, on Heritage Park Road in Piggott, Arkansas. The park and cemetery are located on the former site of the Clay County poor house, built in 1911. The cemetery contains approximately sixty graves, many unmarked, of indigents who died at the home. The buildings of the facility were demolished in 1954, and the cemetery is the principal tangible reminder of its existence.

The cemetery was listed on the National Register of Historic Places in 2005.

See also
 National Register of Historic Places listings in Clay County, Arkansas

References

External links
 

Cemeteries on the National Register of Historic Places in Arkansas
Buildings and structures completed in 1912
Buildings and structures in Clay County, Arkansas
1912 establishments in Arkansas
National Register of Historic Places in Clay County, Arkansas
Cemeteries established in the 1910s